Beijing Panam International Aviation Academy is the largest privately owned airline training facility in the People's Republic of China.

References

 Wuhai

External links
BPIAA Official Web-site

Aviation schools in China
Universities and colleges in Beijing